Fountainbridge is an area of Edinburgh, Scotland, a short distance west of the city centre, adjoining Tollcross with East Fountainbridge and West Port to the east, Polwarth to the west and south, Dalry and Haymarket to the north and Gorgie and North Merchiston to the west. The main streets through the area are Fountainbridge and Dundee Street.

The Union Canal which originally continued a short distance north-eastwards to Port Hopetoun  at Lothian Road now terminates at the Lochrin Basin. The canal to the south and the route of the former Caledonian Railway (now converted to the West Approach Road) to the north continue to define the area.

History

Before the mid-18th century (when a sweet-water well, or "fountain" was erected near Grove Street), the area was called Foulbridge: a name relating to a bridge crossing the Foul Burn, a rivulet connecting the Burgh Loch on the Meadows to the Water of Leith but largely operating as a sewer. The name Foulbridge appears in several older documents from at least 1512. From around 1760 the bridge was rechristened Fountainbridge. The bridge disappeared when the stream was culverted (as a sewer) around 1820 but by then the name had attached to the wider area.

The name "Fountainbridge" appears on John Laurie's A plan of the County of Mid-Lothian of 1763. According to the Edinburgh Evening Courant newspaper in 1774 the name derived from the Foullbridge Well of "singularly sweet water". The Foul Burn is still marked as a "common sewer" on maps until at least 1784.

The original Houpetoun basin was the Edinburgh end of the canal. It was a very busy place, handling the import of coal, grain, building materials and passengers into the city. It was named for the Earl of Hopetoun, who owned the collieries.  Another basin, named after  the Duke of Hamilton was later built nearby accompanied by the Port Hamilton Tavern

Fountainbridge was extended as West Fountainbridge in 1869, renamed Dundee Street in 1885.

The Leamington lift bridge was installed around 1906 where  replacing a previous bridge built in 1869.

In 1856 a wealthy US entrepreneur, Henry Lee Norris, established the North British Rubber Company in the buildings of the former Castle Silk Mill alongside the Union Canal.

The Castle Silk Mills produced top quality Kashmir shawls known as Edinburgh shawls, but had closed by 1844-5  and the building was taken by the rubber company. 'Edinburgh shawls' had been a major capital investment in a brand of textile which was difficult due to the difficulties of sourcing silk and competition from better known brands in Renfrewshire, especially Paisley.

The company's Castle Mill premises eventually covered  of land in the area and employed thousands of workers over five generations in manufacturing a variety of products from galoshes and rubber Wellington boots to solid rubber wheels for Thomson steam traction engines (after 1870), pneumatic tyres (after 1890) and hot-water bottles. The company's design for trench boots, which was officially chosen by the War Office during the Great War, led to a lucrative government contract which saw the firm supplying up to 2,750 pairs a day, reaching a total of 1.2 million pairs by the end of the war.

Another company which established itself in Fountainbridge in 1856 was McEwan's Brewery. The site on the north side of Fountainbridge and Dundee Street was chosen because of its proximity to both the Union Canal and the new line of the Caledonian Railway. Within five years, the firm's annual turnover was £40,000 and it went on to become one of the market leaders in the Scottish brewing industry over the next century.

The Second World War brought another boom with the production of millions of civilian gas masks and barrage-balloon fabric. In 1958, the company produced Britain's first traffic cones for the M6 motorway. The United States Rubber Company gradually took control of the company. The United States Rubber Company was renamed Uniroyal in 1961 and North British took on this name when eventually taken-over in 1966. In that year, Uniroyal relocated the tyre manufacture to Newbridge, then outside Edinburgh. In 1957 Castle Mills began the production of Royalite thermoplastic sheeting. In 1967 Royalite production was moved to a new factory adjacent to the tyre plant at Newbridge. The manufacture of PowerGrip drive belts was relocated to the former Arrol-Johnston factory at Heathhall, Dumfries around 1970. All that remained at Castle Mills was the hose factory which continued until its closure in late 1973.

Fountain Brewery become part of Scottish Brewers in 1931 after a merger with Youngers who subsequently merged to create Scottish & Newcastle Brewers.In 1973, as a result of a £13 million investment, a new Fountain Brewery was opened on the south side of Fountainbridge on the former site of the North British Rubber Company's premises while the hose factory was converted to a bottling plant.  The site was home to a social club known as the 'Tartan Club'. The brewery was modernised, leaving little of the original buildings.
In 1886 Cooke's Royal Circus was built in East Fountainbridge for John Henry Cooke (1837-1917). It was demolished and the Palladium built on the site in 1911, operating at first as a cinema and later as a theatre. In later years one of the gap sites was briefly offered as a big top venue for the Edinburgh Fringe

From the early 19th century until the late 20th century Fountainbridge was home to two of the city's major industries and a mixture of working-class tenement housing, which in part degenerated into some of the worst of the city's slums between the 1930s and the 1960s. Before being elected Prime Minister in 1964 the then Labour Party leader Harold Wilson toured the area  with Pat Rogan  and promised major redevelopment under a Labour government, though this did not take place for another generation.

Slum clearances in Fountainbridge were underway in 1966  as part of city wide actions  by Edinburgh Corporation between 1950 and 1973 in which 35,237 individuals left their homes and 16,556 houses were closed or demolished erasing for ever streets and neighbourhoods housing vibrant communities.

Redevelopment 

Redevelopment of the area began with the construction of the Fountain Park leisure centre on former brewery ground on the north side of Dundee Street in 1998. This multi-purpose complex includes an adventure golf course, a laser tag arena, an amusement arcade, a multiplex cinema and ten-pin bowling, alongside multiple food outlets. This cinema replaced the palais de danse which had been the largest cinema in Edinburgh, a ballroom and a skating rink. 

Closure of the Fountainbridge brewery was announced in 2004 with the entire  site gradually decommissioned and demolished between and 2006 and 2011 as part of a wider redevelopment and regeneration programme which began with Edinburgh Quay at the Lochrin Basin on the canal in 2004.

After an extensive programme of community consultation, a masterplan for the site was announced in 2016. The redevelopment plans included new homes (including social housing), new office spaces and shops, hotels and new sites for Boroughmuir High School and Edinburgh Printmakers.

In 2012, construction of new student accommodation for Edinburgh Napier University began on the south side of Fountainbridge opposite Fountain Park. Four concrete frame buildings contain 777 bedrooms in clusters of 4-8 bedrooms, each with a communal kitchen and dining area.

The new facilities for Boroughmuir opened in 2018, featuring modern teaching spaces and a rooftop basketball court
The only surviving structure from the original Castle Mills industrial complex is the former headquarters of the North British Rubber Company  which is now the new home of Edinburgh Printmakers.  In 2014 the building featured hoardings by Callum Colvin in the windows. The redevelopment of this derelict building transformed it into a multi-use arts complex and open spaces for printmaking production.

Edinburgh Quay is now the home of the annual Edinburgh Canal Festival 

Fountainbridge is now home to a growing community of residents who live on barges and canal boats.

Notable people
Sean Connery was born and grew up here. His former production company was known as Fountainbridge Films. He later shut down the company after a series of disputes with a business partner.

The Tollcross Local History Project  published historical studies of the Tollcross, Fountainbridge and West Port areas which tell the stories of the people who lived in the area and worked at the factories, mills and breweries. Local family run businesses such as Dalton Scrap Metal and Lang's icecream shop are mentioned and William Mcgonagall lived nearby  Anti-slavery campaigner Frederick Douglass lived locally in Gilmore Place during his time in Scotland.

References

External links
Bartholomew's Chronological map of Edinburgh (1919)

Areas of Edinburgh